Biren Nag (1922–1964) was an acclaimed Indian film director and art director in Hindi cinema.  Prior to taking up direction himself, he served as Art Director for four of the most beautiful films shot in Mumbai in the late 1950s and early 1960s: Pyaasa (1957) Kala Pani (1958) Chaudhvin Ka Chand  (1960); and  Sahib Bibi Aur Ghulam (1962). He won a 1960 Filmfare Award for Best Art Direction for his work on Chaudhvin Ka Chand  (1960).

In 1962 he directed his first film, Bees Saal Baad a noirish ghost story also starring Waheeda Rehman and Biswajeet, which garnered him a Filmfare Best Director Award nomination in 1963. The film was the top grosser at the box office in 1962, a super hit doing gross business worth Rs. 3, 00, 00,000 and net business worth Rs. 1, 50, 00,000. He also directed Kohraa in 1964, repeating the lead pair of his debut. However, he died soon after the film was released.

Filmography

(Both the films were produced by Hemanta Mukherjee. He was also the music director and the lead playback singer in both of them)

References

External links

Hindi-language film directors
Indian art directors
1922 births
1964 deaths
Film directors from Kolkata
Filmfare Awards winners
20th-century Indian film directors